The Hertfordshire presidents' Cup is an annual rugby union knock-out club competition organised by the Hertfordshire Rugby Football Union.  It was first introduced during the 1970–71 season, with the inaugural winners being Fullerians.  It is the most important rugby union cup competition in Hertfordshire, ahead of the Hertfordshire presidents' Tankard and Hertfordshire presidents' Trophy. 

The presidents' Cup is currently open to the first teams of club sides based in Hertfordshire that play in tier 6 (London 1 North) of the English rugby union league system, as well as the 2nd teams of higher ranked clubs in the region (tiers 3–5).  The format is a knockout cup with a first round, semi-finals and a final to be held at Allianz Park (Saracen's home ground) in April–May on the same date and same venue as the Tankard and Trophy finals.

Hertfordshire presidents' Cup winners

Number of wins
Tabard (11)
Hertford (9)
Bishop's Stortford (8)
Cheshunt (5)
Fullerians (5)
Letchworth Garden City (5)
Old Albanian (2)
Hemel Hempstead (1)
Tring (1)
Old Verulamian (1)

Notes

See also
 Hertfordshire RFU
 Hertfordshire presidents' Tankard
 Hertfordshire presidents' Trophy
 English rugby union system
 Rugby union in England

References

External links
 Hertfordshire RFU

Recurring sporting events established in 1970
1970 establishments in England
Rugby union cup competitions in England
Rugby union in Hertfordshire